The Baylor Lariat is the student newspaper of Baylor University in Waco, Texas. In 2008, 2010, 2011, 2012, 2013 and 2014, the Houston Press Club named it the best student newspaper in the state of Texas.

History
The Baylor Lariat was officially begun in 1900 as The Varsity Lariat; it was formed out of a realization that "a high grade weekly was desired" to keep students, faculty, and alumni aware of campus events and news (including news from nearby colleges).  The Lariat replaced The Baylor Weekly Leaf, whose editor was credited in the Lariat's first issue with "taking the initiative" of reporting Baylor news.

Gay marriage controversy
On February 27, 2004, The Baylor Lariat published an editorial in support of San Francisco's offering of marriage licenses to gay couples. The piece, which was supported by five of the editorial board's seven members, elicited a response from Robert B. Sloan Jr., who served as Baylor University president at the time. In a written statement, he claimed that he and many of the students, alumni, and parents were "justifiably outraged".

See also
List of student newspapers in the United States of America

References

External links
The Lariat Online

Student newspapers published in Texas
Baylor University
Newspapers established in 1900
1900 establishments in Texas
Daily newspapers published in Texas